A sports venue is a building, structure, or place in which a sporting competition is held.

A stadium (plural: stadiums or stadia) or arena is a place or venue for sports or other events and consists of a field or stage either partly or completely surrounded by a tiered structure designed to allow spectators to stand or sit and view the event.

Types of sports venues 

 Arena
 Area of water used for a regatta, e.g. Bosbaan, Lake Attersee,  or the Atlantic Ocean
 Bandy field
 Baseball park
 Billiard hall
 Bowling alley
 Bullring
 Cricket ground
 Gym
 Horse racing venues (hippodrome)
 Ice hockey arena
 Motorsport venues (autodrome)
 Race track
 Riding hall
 Shooting range
 Ski jumping hill
 Speed skating rink
 Stadium
 Tennis court
 Swimming pool
 Velodrome

See also 
 List of indoor arenas
 List of sporting venues with a highest attendance of 100,000 or more
 List of stadiums by capacity
 Lists of sports venues
 Multi-purpose stadium
 Pitch (sports field)
 Sports complex

References